Mukherjee, Mukerjee, Mookerjee, Mukerji, Mukherji, Mukhujje or Mookherjee is a Bengali Kulin Brahmin surname of the Hindu Religion, common among residents of the Indian state of West Bengal and Bangladesh. The traditional Bengali version is Mukhopaddhae, which is sometimes written Mukhopadhyay.

Origins

All Mukherjees belong to the Bharadvaja gotra or the clan of the rishi Bharadvaja. The Mukherjees belong to the Kulin Brahmin class and are also classified as Rarhi Brahmins. The origins of most of the Brahmins in Southern Bengal can be traced back to the Gangetic plains of Northern India, from the ancient city of Kanyakubja (Kannauj). It is believed that in the 11th century CE, the ruler of Bengal, Adisara, summoned five Brahmins from Kanyakubja, who were known for their superior rank to the region. These Vedic Brahmins were supposed to have nine gunas (favoured attributes), among which was insistence on same rank marriages. Though the first wave of Brahmin migration to Bengal started during the Maurya period and the Jain Acharya Bhadrabahu – regarded to be the preceptor of Chandragupta Maurya – is said to have been born in Brahmin family of Pundravardhana (or ), the medium to large scale migrations of Brahmins from other parts of India to Bengal, especially from the ancient Kanyakubja region, happened during the last part of the Buddhist Pala Empire and early part of Hindu Sena dynasty. This region is known as Radha or Rarh Bhoomi, leading to these clans of Brahmins being categorised as Radhi or Rarhi Brahmins.

For several decades from the 1970s to the 1990s, the West Bengal Higher Secondary board mandatorily changed all spelling variants (Mukherjee, Mukerjee, Mookerji etc.) to Mukhopadhyay (as was done with Bannerjee, Ganguly, etc.)

Notable people with the last name Mukherjee

A
Aarti Mukherji, singer
Abaninath Mukherji, revolutionary and co-founder of the Communist Party of India
Abhijit Mukherjee (born 1960), politician
Ajoy Mukherjee, fourth chief minister of West Bengal, India
Alok Mukherjee
Alolika Mukhopadhyay (Mukherjee),(born 1944), columnist
Arko Pravo Mukherjee, Indian singer-songwriter
Arindam Mukherjee, photojournalist
Arun Mukherjee, actor
Arundhati Mukherjee, actress
Ashutosh Mukherjee, writer
Anirban Mukhopadhyay, marketing scholar
Asim Mukhopadhyay, historian
Ayan Mukherjee, director
Sir Ashutosh Mukherjee (1864–1924) Educationist, Vice-Chancellor of the University of Calcutta (1906–1924), and referred commonly as 'Bengal Tiger'.
Asoke Kumar Mukerji, Indian Foreign Service(diplomat)

B
Banaphool (Balaichand Mukherjee)
Barun Mukherjee, politician
Bela Mukhopadhyay, writer
Benode Behari Mukherjee (1904–1980), painter
Bharati Mukherjee (born 1940), writer
Bijan Kumar Mukherjea (1891–1956), judge
Biswanath Mukherjee, computer scientist
Budhaditya Mukherjee (born 1955), musician
 Bhasha Mukherjee - Miss England 2019

C
Chandrani Mukherjee, singer
Chayan Mukherjee

D
Debashis Mukherjee, theoretical chemist
Dhan Gopal Mukerji (1890–1936)
Dwijen Mukherjee, Tagore song exponent

H
Hemanta Kumar Mukhopadhyay (1920–1989), music director
Hrishikesh Mukherjee (1922–2006), director
Harendra Coomar Mookerjee, Vice President of Constituent Assembly of India

I
Indrani Mukherjea, former HR Consultant and media executive
Indrani Mukherjee, actress

J
Joia Mukherjee, physician
Jadugopal Mukherjee (1886–1976), revolutionary
Jaidip Mukerjea (born 1942), tennis player
Jatindra Nath Mukherjee (Bagha Jatin) (1879–1915), Freedom Fighter and Revolutionary Leader
Jolly Mukherjee, singer, songwriter, producer
Joy Mukherjee (1939–2012), actor and director

K
Kajol Mukherjee, Bollywood Actress
Kalyan Mukherjea, classical musician
Kalyan Mukherjee, politician
Kamaleshwar Mukherjee, director
Kamalinee Mukherjee, actress
Kashinath Mukherjee, classical musician
Keshto Mukherjee, comedian/Actor

M
Madhabi Mukherjee, actor
Manabendra Mukherjee, Singer
Mahua Mukherjee, dancer
Manas Mukherjee, singer and composer
Mani Shankar Mukherjee, writer
Mrinalini Mukherjee, sculptor
Mithu Mukherjee (cricketer), former cricketer
Mohua Mukherjee (born August 1952), author and activist
Monu Mukhopadhyay (1930–2020), Indian film and television actor
Justice Manoj Kumar Mukherjee
Mitali Mukherjee, Bangladeshi singer

N
Nandini Mukherjee, computer scientist
Neel Mukherjee, writer
Nibaran Chandra Mukherjee
Nihar Mukherjee, former General Secretary of the Socialist Unity Centre of India party
Nirmal Kumar Mukarji, former Cabinet Secretary of India and former Governor of Punjab (India)

P
Pranab Mukherjee, 13th President of India
Prasun Mukherjee, police commissioner
Prasun Kumar Mukherjee, managing director of Sesa Goa Limited
Prithwindra Mukherjee 
Pulok Mukherjee, pharmacist
Oindrila Mukherjee, Advocate

R
Raghu Mukherjee, film director and model
Rahul Mukerjee, academic and statistician
Raj Mukherji
Rajendra Nath Mookerjee, industrialist
Ram Kamal Mukherjee, journalist, historian, and author
Ram Mukherjee, Rani's father
Rani Mukerji, Bollywood actress
Reshmi Mukherjee, astrophysicist
Robin Mukherjee, Indian cricketer
Rudrangshu Mukherjee, historian and author
Rwitobroto Mukherjee, film and theatre actor

S

Sarada Devi (Saradamani Mukhopadhyaya)
Sabyasachi Mukherjee (born 1974), fashion designer
Sabyasachi Mukharji (born 1927 ), Chief Justice of India
Sagarika Mukherjee (born 1970), singer and actress
Samhita Mukhopadhyay (born 1978), writer and journalist
Sandeep Mukherjee (born 1964), Indian-American artist
Sandhya Mukhopadhyay (born 1931), singer and musician
Sangram Mukherjee (born 1981), football player
Sapna Mukherjee, singer
Sarah Mukherjee (born 1967), correspondent 
Sashadhar Mukherjee (died 1990), producer
Satish Chandra Mukherjee (1865–1948), educator
Satyabrata Mookherjee (born 1932), politician
Shantanu Mukherjee (born 1972), singer and actor
Shantilal Mukherjee, actor in Bengali theatre and films
Sharbani Mukherjee, actress
Sharda Mukherjee (born 1919), Governor & w/o Subroto Mukerjee
Shiboprosad Mukherjee (born 1974), film director, writer and actor
Shirshendu Mukhopadhyay (born 1935), author
Shomu Mukherjee, Kajol's Father, director
Shyam Mukherjee, filmmaker
Shyam Mukherjee, politician
Syama Prasad Mukherjee (1901–1953), politician
Syamadas Mukhopadhyaya, mathematician
Siddhartha Mukherjee (born 1970), physician
Sreelekha Mukherji, actress
Srijit Mukherji, director
Subhash Mukhopadhyay, poet
Subhash Mukhopadhyay (physician) or Subhas Mukherjee
Subodh Mukherjee (1921–2005), filmmaker
Subrata Mukherjee (1946-2021), politician
Subroto Mukerjee, first Air Chief Marshal of Independent India
Sujit Mukherjee, cricketer and writer
Sujan Mukhopadhyay, film, television and theatre actor
Suman Mukhopadhyay, filmmaker and theatre director
Suroopa Mukherjee, author
Sushmita Mukherjee, actress
Swastika Mukherjee (born 1980), actress

T
Tanisha Mukherjee, Tanisha, actress, Kajol's sister
Tanuja Mukherjee
Tathagata Mukherjee (born 1985), actor
Troilokyanath Mukhopadhyay

U
Udayan Mukherjee, journalist

See also
25629 Mukherjee
Kulin Brahmins
Mukherjee-Samarth family
Mukherjee Commission

References
Swami Sahajanand Saraswati Rachnawali (Selected works of Swami Sahajanand Saraswati), Prakashan Sansthan, Delhi, 2003.

Brahmin communities
Bengali Hindu surnames
Hindu surnames
Kulin Brahmin surnames
Social groups of West Bengal
Indian surnames